Ian Hinchliffe (born 1952) is a British physicist at Lawrence Berkeley National Laboratory. He obtained his BA and his PhD in physics from Oxford University.

In 1983 he became a Staff Senior Scientist at Lawrence Berkeley National Laboratory, where he served as head of the theoretical physics group from 1992 to 1999.

Trained in theoretical physics, his primary activity is with the ATLAS experiment at CERN's Large Hadron Collider, which he joined in 1996; he served as ATLAS physics coordinator in 2006–2007 and currently heads Berkeley Lab's ATLAS group. His research emphasizes the importance of experiment in testing theoretical ideas, and in driving theoretical developments aimed at understanding interactions among fundamental particles. Much of his research looks to show how the Standard Model can be tested at hadron colliders.

In 2011, Hinchliffe, Chris Quigg, Estia Eichten, and Kenneth Lane won the J. J. Sakurai Prize for Theoretical Particle Physics "for their work, separately and collectively, to chart a course of the exploration of TeV scale physics using multi-TeV hadron colliders".

See also

References

External links 
 Scientific publications of Ian Hinchliffe on INSPIRE-HEP

1952 births
Living people
Particle physicists
Alumni of the University of Oxford
University of California, Berkeley staff
J. J. Sakurai Prize for Theoretical Particle Physics recipients
People associated with CERN
Fellows of the American Physical Society